is a paste made from fish or other meat. The term can also refer to a number of East Asian foods that use that paste as their primary ingredient. It is available in many shapes, forms, and textures, and is often used to mimic the texture and color of the meat of lobster, crab, grilled Japanese eel or shellfish.

The most common surimi product in the Western market is imitation crab meat. Such a product often is sold as krab, imitation crab and mock crab in the United States, and as seafood sticks, crab sticks, fish sticks, seafood highlighter or seafood extender in Commonwealth nations. In Britain, the product is sometimes known as seafood sticks to avoid breaking Trading Standards rules on false advertising.

History
Fish pastes have been a popular food in East Asia. In China, the food is used to make fish balls (魚蛋/魚丸) and ingredients in a thick soup known as "Geng" (羹) common in Fujian cuisine. In Japan, the earliest surimi production was in 1115 for making kamaboko. Alaska pollock, native to the seas around Japan, played an important role in the development of processed surimi due to its high protein biomass. Satsumaage, chikuwa, and hanpen were other major surimi foods prior to 1960.

After World War 2, machines were used to process surimi, but it was always sold fresh, since freezing had a negative effect on the finished product by denaturing the gel-forming capability of the surimi. Between 1945 and 1950, record catches of pollock in Hokkaido (primarily for harvesting the roe) resulted in large quantities of fish meat, so the Hokkaido Fisheries Research Station established a team to make better use of the excess. A team, led by K. Nishiya, discovered the addition of salt during the processing prevented the spongey texture that resulted after freezing, and also began using salted surimi in the manufacture of fish sausages. In 1969, Nishitani Yōsuke further discovered that the use of sucrose, or other carbohydrates such as sorbitol, acted as a cryoprotectant by stabilizing the Actomyosin in the surimi without denaturing the fish protein the way salt does.

Surimi industrial technology developed by Japan in the early 1960s promoted the growth of the surimi industry. In 1963, the government of Hokkaido applied for a patent on the surimi processing technology, and companies such as Nippon Suisan and Maruha-Nichiro implemented at-sea frozen fish processing in the mid 1960s. After a peak of surimi consumption in 1975, consumption in Japan began to decline as the preference for other meats (beef, pork) went up, and lower quality products on the market influenced consumer opinion of surimi overall. Although the quality standards for fish in Japanese surimi products was quite high, the consumer perception of surimi generally attributes it to by-catch and lower quality fish.

When the Magnuson–Stevens Fishery Conservation and Management Act was enacted in 1976, the United States became involved in the surimi industry through joint ventures with Japanese fish processors. Imitation crab products were developed in Japan between 1973 and 1975, and although not as popular in Japan, opened the door to international surimi consumption. Further developments for using different types of fish were made since the 1980s. The first US surimi processing plant was built in 1984 on Kodiak Island, and Canada in 1995, aided by Japanese technicians.

In the early 1990s and the late 2000s, the price of surimi skyrocketed. This impacted many small Japanese kamaboko companies, causing many to bankrupt due to cost of materials as well as the diminishing habit of eating kamaboko daily by younger generations. As the price rose, surimi industry sought methods to minimize waste. The decanter technique, developed in the mid 1990s, further improved the recovery of fish meat during the washing process.

Two to three million tons of fish from around the world, amounting to 2–3 percent of the world fisheries' supply, are used for the production of surimi and surimi-based products. The United States and Japan are major producers of surimi and surimi-based products. Thailand has become an important producer. China's role as producer is increasing. Many newcomers to the surimi industry have emerged, including Lithuania, Vietnam, Chile, the Faroe Islands, France, and Malaysia.

Production

Lean meat from fish or land animals is first separated or minced. The meat then is rinsed numerous times to eliminate undesirable odors. The result is beaten and pulverized to form a gelatinous paste. Depending on the desired texture and flavor of the surimi product, the gelatinous paste is mixed with differing proportions of additives such as  binders (starch, egg white,  soy protein, transglutaminases), salt, vegetable oil, humectants, cyroprotectants (sorbitol, sugar), seasonings, and flavor enhancers such as monosodium glutamate (MSG).

If the surimi is to be packed and frozen, food-grade cryoprotectants are added as preservatives while the meat paste is being mixed. Under most circumstances, surimi is processed immediately into a formed and cured product.

Fish surimi
Typically the resulting paste, depending on the type of fish and whether it was rinsed in the production process, is tasteless and must be flavored artificially. According to the United States Department of Agriculture National Nutrient Database, fish surimi contains about 76% water, 15% protein, 6.85% carbohydrate, and 0.9% fat.

In North America and Europe, surimi also alludes to fish-based products manufactured using this process. A generic term for fish-based surimi in Japanese is "fish-puréed products" (魚肉練り製品 gyoniku neri seihin). The gelling quality of whitefish make them ideal for surimi production, but other fish including the dark meat, has been incorporated as technological advances solve gelling issues.

The fish used to make surimi include:

 Alaska pollock (Gadus chalcogrammus)
 Atlantic cod (Gadus morhua)
 Big-head pennah croaker (Pennahia macrocephalus)
 Bigeyes (Priacanthus arenatus)
 Golden threadfin bream (Nemipterus virgatus)
 Milkfish (Chanos chanos)
 Pacific whiting (Merluccius productus)
 Various shark species
 Swordfish (Xiphias gladius)
 Tilapia
 Oreochromis mossambicus
 Oreochromis niloticus niloticus
 Black bass
 Smallmouth bass (Micropterus dolomieu)
 Largemouth bass (Micropterus salmoides)
 Florida black bass (Micropterus floridanus)

Meat surimi

Although seen less commonly in Japanese and Western markets, pork surimi (肉漿) is a common product found in a wide array of Chinese foods. The process of making pork surimi is similar to making fish surimi except that leaner cuts of meat are used and rinsing is omitted. Pork surimi is made into pork balls (Chinese: gòngwán; 貢丸) which, when cooked, have a texture similar to fish balls, but are much firmer and denser.

Pork surimi also is mixed with flour and water to make a type of dumpling wrapper called "yànpí" (燕皮 or 肉燕皮) that has the similar firm and bouncy texture of cooked surimi.

Beef surimi also can be shaped into a ball form to make "beef balls" (牛肉丸). When beef surimi is mixed with chopped beef tendons and formed into balls, "beef tendon balls" (牛筋丸) are produced. Both of these products commonly are used in Chinese hot pot as well as served in Vietnamese phở. Bakso, made from beef surimi, is a popular common food found in Indonesia.

The surimi process also is used to make turkey products. It is used to make turkey burgers, turkey sausage, turkey pastrami, turkey franks, turkey loaf and turkey salami.

Chemistry of curing
The curing of the fish paste is caused by the polymerization of myosin when heated. The species of fish is the most important factor that affects this curing process. Many pelagic fish with higher fat contents lack the needed type of heat-curing myosin and are not used for surimi.

Certain kinds of fish, such as the Pacific whiting, cannot form firm surimi without additives such as egg white or potato starch. Before the outbreak of bovine spongiform encephalopathy (BSE, mad cow disease), it was an industrial practice to add bovine blood plasma into the fish paste to help its curing or gel-forming. Today some manufacturers may use a transglutaminase to improve the texture of surimi. Although illegal, the practice of adding borax to fish balls and surimi to heighten the bouncy texture of the fish balls and whiten the product is widespread in Asia.

Uses and products

Surimi is a useful ingredient for producing various kinds of processed foods. It allows a manufacturer to imitate the texture and taste of a more expensive product, such as lobster tail, using a relatively low-cost material. Surimi is an inexpensive source of protein.

In Asian cultures, surimi is eaten as a food in its own right and seldom used to imitate other foods. In Japan, fish cakes (kamaboko) and fish sausages, as well as other extruded fish products, are commonly sold as cured surimi.

In Chinese cuisine, fish surimi, often called "fish paste", is used directly as stuffing or made into balls. Balls made from lean beef (牛肉丸, lit. "beef ball") and pork surimi often are seen in Chinese cuisine. Fried, steamed, and boiled surimi products also are found commonly in Southeast Asian cuisine.

In the West, surimi products usually are imitation seafood products, such as crab, abalone, shrimp, calamari, and scallop. Several companies do produce surimi sausages, luncheon meats, hams, and burgers. Some examples include Salmolux salmon burgers and SeaPak surimi ham, salami, and rolls. A patent was issued for the process of making even higher-quality proteins from fish such as in the making of imitation steak from surimi. Surimi is also used to make kosher imitation shrimp and crabmeat, using only kosher fish such as pollock. There is also a surimi salad which consists of imitation crab meat mixed with mayonnaise and vegetables.

List of foods made from surimi 

 A-gei - a stuffed tofu
Chikuwa - a Japanese grilled surimi
 Crab stick - also known as imitation crab
 Kamaboko - shaped into loaves and steamed, served sliced
Gyoniku soseji - fish sausages
 Hanpen - made from a mix of yam and surimi, cut into triangles
 Tsukune (Tsumire) - often skewered and cooked a variety of ways
 Fish ball/Bakso ikan
 Narutomaki - a type of kamaboko
 Yong tau foo - stuffed tofu.
 Satsuma-age - deep fried surimi patties
 Ngo hiang - wrapped in tofu skin and fried
 Pempek - shaped into logs and deep fried
 Gefilte fish - formed into round patties and poached
 Keropok lekor - a Malaysian hawker food. Fish patties formed into finger-like and then deep fried. Ate with sweet chilli sauce.

See also 

 List of seafood dishes
List of Japanese dishes
Fisheries management

References

External links

 Surimiman's Surimi School Worldwide
 USDA National Nutrient Database for Standard Reference Release 16-1

 
Fish products
Imitation foods
Japanese cuisine
Japanese seafood
Food paste